Rybny is a rural locality (a khutor) in Ust-Khopyorskoye Rural Settlement, Serafimovichsky District, Volgograd Oblast, Russia. The population was 203 as of 2010. There are 5 streets.

Geography 
Rybny is located 42 km west of Serafimovich (the district's administrative centre) by road. Ust-Khoperskaya is the nearest rural locality.

References 

Rural localities in Serafimovichsky District